KLID is an American radio station licensed to Poplar Bluff, Missouri, broadcasting on 1340 kHz AM.  The station airs a format consisting of News/Talk and Sportstalk. It is owned by Browning Skidmore Broadcasting, Inc. KLID is the "Voice of NASCAR in Poplar Bluff and has been the Voice of the Poplar Bluff Mules for 55 consecutive years.

KLID was founded and named for broadcaster and broadcast engineer Don Lidenton. KLID former DJs include Scott Innes who was the voice of Scooby Doo.

References

External links

News and talk radio stations in the United States
Oldies radio stations in the United States
LID